Tempelhof-Schöneberg is the seventh borough of Berlin, formed in 2001 by merging the former boroughs of Tempelhof and Schöneberg. Situated in the south of the city it shares borders with the boroughs of Mitte and Friedrichshain-Kreuzberg in the north, Charlottenburg-Wilmersdorf and Steglitz-Zehlendorf in the west as well as Neukölln in the east.

Subdivision

Tempelhof-Schöneberg consists of six localities as from north to south:
 Schöneberg
 Friedenau
 Tempelhof
 Mariendorf
 Marienfelde
 Lichtenrade

Demographics
As of 2010, the borough had a population of 335,060, of whom about 105,000 (31%) were of non-German origin. The largest ethnic minorities were Turks constituting 7% of the population; Poles at 4%; Yugoslavians at 3%; Arabs at 2.5%;
Afro-Germans at 1.5% and Russians at 1.3%.

Politics

Borough assembly
The governing body of Tempelhof-Schöneberg is the borough assembly (Bezirksverordnetenversammlung). It has responsibility for passing laws and electing the city government, including the mayor. The most recent district council election was held on 26 September 2021, leading to a Green-red coalition between the Greens and the Social Democratic Party. The results were as follows:

! colspan=2| Party
! Lead candidate
! Votes
! %
! +/-
! Seats
! +/-
|-
| bgcolor=| 
| align=left| Alliance 90/The Greens (Grüne)
| align=left| Saskia Ellenbeck
| 42,758
| 23.6
|  1.7
| 15
|  2
|-
| bgcolor=| 
| align=left| Social Democratic Party (SPD)
| align=left| Angelika Schöttler
| 42,488
| 23.5
|  1.2
| 15
| ±0
|-
| bgcolor=| 
| align=left| Christian Democratic Union (CDU)
| align=left| Matthias Steuckardt
| 37,598
| 20.8
|  0.3
| 13
|  1
|-
| bgcolor=| 
| align=left| The Left (LINKE)
| align=left| Elisabeth Wissel
| 15,999
| 8.8
|  0.8
| 5
| ±0
|-
| bgcolor=| 
| align=left| Free Democratic Party (FDP)
| align=left| Reinhard Frede
| 12,747
| 7.0
|  0.3
| 4
| ±0
|-
| bgcolor=| 
| align=left| Alternative for Germany (AfD)
| align=left| Karsten Franck
| 10,425
| 5.8
|  5.3
| 3
|  3
|-
| colspan=8 bgcolor=lightgrey|
|-
| bgcolor=| 
| align=left| Tierschutzpartei
| align=left| 
| 5,110
| 2.8
| New
| 0
| New
|-
| bgcolor=| 
| align=left| Volt Germany
| align=left| 
| 3,001
| 1.7
| New
| 0
| New
|-
| bgcolor=| 
| align=left| Die PARTEI
| align=left| 
| 2,924
| 1.6
|  0.1
| 0
| ±0
|-
| bgcolor=| 
| align=left| dieBasis
| align=left| 
| 2,680
| 1.5
| New
| 0
| New
|-
| bgcolor=| 
| align=left| Free Voters
| align=left| 
| 1,940
| 1.1
| New
| 0
| New
|-
| bgcolor=| 
| align=left| Klimaliste
| align=left| 
| 1,701
| 0.9
| New
| 0
| New
|-
| bgcolor=| 
| align=left| Pirate Party Germany
| align=left| 
| 1,072
| 0.6
|  1.4
| 0
| ±0
|-
| bgcolor=| 
| align=left| Ecological Democratic Party
| align=left| 
| 438
| 0.2
| New
| 0
| New
|-
| 
| align=left| Liberal Democrats
| align=left| 
| 104
| 0.1
| New
| 0
| New
|-
! colspan=3| Valid votes
! 180,985
! 99.0
! 
! 
! 
|-
! colspan=3| Invalid votes
! 1,838
! 1.0
! 
! 
! 
|-
! colspan=3| Total
! 182,823
! 100.0
! 
! 55
! ±0
|-
! colspan=3| Electorate/voter turnout
! 256,738
! 71.2
!  7.1
! 
! 
|-
| colspan=8| Source: Elections Berlin
|}

District government
The district mayor (Bezirksbürgermeister) is elected by the Bezirksverordnetenversammlung, and positions in the district government (Bezirksamt) are apportioned based on party strength. Jörn Oltmann of the Greens was elected mayor on 17 November 2021. Since the 2021 municipal elections, the composition of the district government is as follows:

Twin towns – sister cities

Tempelhof-Schöneberg is twinned with:

 Ahlen, Germany (1964)
 Amstelveen, Netherlands (1957)
 Bad Kreuznach (district), Germany (1964)
 Barnet (London), England, United Kingdom (1955)
 Charenton-le-Pont, France (1984)
 Koszalin, Poland (1995)
 Levallois-Perret, France (1986)
 Mezitli, Turkey (2012)
 Nahariya, Israel (1970)
 Paderborn (district), Germany (1962)
 Penzberg, Germany (1964)
 Teltow-Fläming (district), Germany (1991)
 Werra-Meißner (district), Germany (1957)
 Wuppertal, Germany (1964)

Sites of interest
Wikimedia Deutschland has its offices in Tempelhof-Schöneberg.

See also

Berlin-Tempelhof-Schöneberg (electoral district)

References

External links

Official homepage 
Official homepage of Berlin

 
Districts of Berlin